Fenby is a surname. Notable people with the surname include:

Andy Fenby (born 1985), Welsh rugby union footballer
Eric Fenby OBE (1906–1997), English composer and teacher, Frederick Delius's amanuensis from 1928 to 1934
Jonathan Fenby (born 1942), founding partner and managing director of the China team at Trusted Sources, London
Joseph B. Fenby (1841–1903), inventor of the “Electro-Magnetic Phonograph” in 1863
Thomas Fenby (1875–1956), British Liberal politician and blacksmith

See also
Ashby cum Fenby, village and civil parish in North East Lincolnshire, England
Fanbyn